Matt Cameron (born 1969) is an Australian playwright, screenwriter and director, born and based in Melbourne.

Plays
Mr Melancholy (1995) was produced by Griffin in Sydney, La Boite in Brisbane and won the ANPC/New Dramatists Award, which led to a New York production with New York Stage & Film.

Tear from a Glass Eye (1998) which won the Wal Cherry Play of the Year Award and was produced by Playbox in Melbourne and the Gate Theatre in London where he was nominated Most Promising Playwright in the Evening Standard Awards. Footprints on Water (2000) won the British Council International New Playwriting Award and was produced by his company, Neonheart, for Griffin in Sydney, La Mama in Melbourne and ABC Radio.

Ruby Moon (2003) was short-listed for Queensland Premier's Literary Awards and produced by Théâtre Claque in Lausanne, Switzerland (2004).

Hinterland (2004) was produced by Melbourne Theatre Company at the Victorian Arts Centre in Melbourne (2004) and short-listed for NSW Premier's Literary Awards (2005).

His play Poor Boy (2009) was selected by the Melbourne Theatre Company to open the Southbank Theatre.

Television series
Cameron wrote for Full Frontal during 1994–1995. He was the co-creator, co-writer and director for the 2000 comedy television series Introducing Gary Petty, for which he won an AWGIE, and Small Tales & True for The Comedy Channel on Foxtel.

He also created and wrote or co-write Jack Irish (2012-2016), Sunshine (2017) and Safe Harbour (2018).

References

External links

Australian dramatists and playwrights
Australian screenwriters
1969 births
People from Melbourne
Living people